Derrick Francis Van Orden (born September 15, 1969) is an American politician, businessman, actor, and retired United States Navy SEAL who is the U.S. representative for Wisconsin's 3rd congressional district.

Career 
Van Orden served in the United States Navy SEALs from 1988 to 2014.

Political involvement
Van Orden was the Republican nominee for Wisconsin's 3rd congressional district in the 2020 election, narrowly losing to incumbent Democrat Ron Kind. He was nominated to run for the seat again in the 2022 election, and won, narrowly defeating Democratic nominee Brad Pfaff and flipping the district from Democrat to Republican for the first time since 1994. 

Van Orden was present at the United States Capitol during the January 6 United States Capitol attack.

Other work
Van Orden is an actor, appearing in Act of Valor (2012), Surviving the Wild (2018) and Running with the Devil (2019). He opened the Butternut Cafe in Butternut, Wisconsin, in 2017.

LGBT library book incident
On June 17, 2021, Van Orden confronted a staff member at Prairie du Chien Memorial Library in indignation over a display of books with LGBT themes assembled for Pride Month. Van Orden was particularly upset by the book A Day in the Life of Marlon Bundo, about a fictional day in the life of Marlon Bundo, the real-life pet rabbit of former Vice President of the United States Mike Pence, and the rabbit's subsequent same-sex romance. Van Orden submitted a written complaint to the library that the book was "skewing young people to think that Republicans are not inclusive. This book is not informational, it is propaganda". A staff member described Van Orden as "very uncomfortable, threatening" with "full-on shouting" and "aggressively shoving the books around". He wanted to know who had established the display so he could "teach them a lesson". Van Orden subsequently withdrew all the books on display out of the library and then returned them within a week.

Arrest 
On August 27, 2021, Van Orden was arrested at the Eastern Iowa Airport in Cedar Rapids, Iowa, after attempting to carry a fully-loaded SIG Sauer handgun through a security checkpoint. He initially pleaded not guilty, but later waived his rights and pleaded guilty. The court ordered Van Orden to pay fines and complete a gun safety program. He was placed on one year's probation on December 28, 2021.

Electoral history

2020

2022

References

External links
 Congressman Derrick Van Orden official U.S. House website
 Derrick Van Orden for Congress campaign website
 
 

|-

1969 births
21st-century American businesspeople
21st-century American male actors
American male film actors
American restaurateurs
Businesspeople from Wisconsin
Living people
Male actors from Wisconsin
Military personnel from Wisconsin
People from Crawford County, Wisconsin
People from Prairie du Chien, Wisconsin
Republican Party members of the United States House of Representatives from Wisconsin
United States Navy SEALs personnel
Wisconsin Republicans